The O.C. is an American teen drama television series created by Josh Schwartz. It premiered on Fox, an American television network, on August 5, 2003, with the pilot episode "Premiere". The O.C. is set in Newport Beach, Orange County, California and follows the stories of residents in the wealthy, harbor-front community. The series mainly focuses around the Cohen and Cooper families, and the Cohen's adoption of Ryan Atwood, a troubled teenager from Chino, California. The show ran until February 22, 2007, with 92 episodes split over 4 seasons. The first season consisted of twenty-seven episodes, the second season was twenty-four episodes long and preceded by two specials that gave a retrospective look at season one, and previewed the upcoming second season. Season three was twenty-five episodes long, but only sixteen episodes were ordered for the final fourth season as falling ratings led to the show's cancellation.

All four seasons are available on DVD in Regions 1, 2 and 4. Additionally, The O.C. The Complete Series was released on November 27, 2007, in Canada and the United States, which included the first season remastered in widescreen. The complete series was also released as a Region 2 DVD on November 19, 2007, but did not include the remastered version of the first season. For registered members of the US iTunes Store, all four seasons are available for purchase and download. These seasons are also available in the US as video on demand from Amazon Video. In October 2008 the first and second seasons were made available on the United Kingdom iTunes Store. In the United States, the fourth season was also made available in the Zune.

Series overview

Episodes

Season 1 (2003–04)

Season 2 (2004–05)

Season 3 (2005–06)

Season 4 (2006–07)

Ratings

Specials
Two special episodes, not part of the official continuity, were produced to complement the second season and were broadcast on Fox in the weeks leading up to the season premiere. The first documents the show's impact on popular culture, and the second provides "a day in the life" of the show.

References

General
"Backstage Pass: Episode Guide". The OC Insider. Warner Bros. Entertainment Inc. Retrieved on 2008-11-26.
Specific

External links
 

 
Lists of American teen drama television series episodes

it:The O.C.#Episodi